Shoghlabad (also Romanized as Shoghlābād and Shaghlābād; also known as Shoql Ābād and Shughlābād) is a village in Dughayi Rural District, in the Central District of Quchan County, Razavi Khorasan Province, Iran. At the 2006 census, its population was 303, in 97 families.

References 

Populated places in Quchan County